The Welsh League North  was a football league in north and central Wales which formed the first level of the Welsh football league system between 1935 and 1984. 

It is considered North Wales's most successful league, running uninterrupted apart from the Second World War for forty-nine years until its transition into the Welsh Alliance League in for the 1984–85 season.

Champions

 1935–36 - Llandudno
 1936–37 - Llandudno
 1936–37 - Porthmadog
 1937–38 - Llandudno
 1938–39 - Caernarfon Town
 1945–46 - H.M.S. Glendower
 1946–47 
 Western Area: Caernarfon Town
 Eastern Area: Connah's Quay St Davids
 1948–49 - Penrhyn Quarry
 1948–49 - Llandudno Junction
 1949–50 - Holywell Town
 1950–51 - Pwllheli
 1951–52 - Pwllheli
 1952–53 - Holywell Town
 1953–54 - 55th R.A. Tonfannau
 1954–55 - Fflint Town United
 1955–56 - Fflint Town United
 1956–57 - Fflint Town United
 1957–58 - Holywell Town
 1958–59 - Borough United
 1959–60 - Nantlle Vale
 1960–61 - Pwllheli
 1961–62 - Blaenau Ffestiniog
 1962–63 - Borough United
 1963–64 - Holywell Town
 1964–65 - Colwyn Bay
 1965–66 - Caernarfon Town
 1966–67 - Porthmadog
 1967–68 - Porthmadog
 1968–69 - Porthmadog
 1969–70 - Holywell Town
 1970–71 - Bethesda Athletic
 1971–72 - Blaenau Ffestiniog
 1972–73 - Blaenau Ffestiniog
 1973–74 - Blaenau Ffestiniog
 1974–75 - Porthmadog
 1975–76 - Porthmadog
 1976–77 - Bethesda Athletic
 1977–78 - Caernarfon Town
 1978–79 - Caernarfon Town
 1979–80 - Blaenau Ffestiniog
 1980–81 - Colwyn Bay
 1981–82 - Courtaulds Greenfield
 1982–83 - Colwyn Bay
 1983–84 - Colwyn Bay

Number of titles by winning clubs

Porthmadog – 6 titles
Blaenau Ffestiniog – 5 titles
Caernarfon Town – 5 titles
Holywell Town – 4 titles
Colwyn Bay – 4 titles
Llandudno – 3 titles
Fflint Town United – 3 titles
Pwllheli – 3 titles
Bethesda Athletic – 2 titles
Borough United – 2 titles
55th R.A. Tonfannau – 1 title
Connah's Quay St Davids – 1 title
Courtaulds Greenfield – 1 title
H.M.S.Glendower – 1 title
Llandudno Junction – 1 title
Nantlle Vale – 1 title
Penrhyn Quarry – 1 title

See also
List of association football competitions
Welsh Football League – which included the top level league in South Wales

References

External links

Football leagues in Wales
Sports leagues established in 1935
Sports leagues disestablished in 1984
1935 establishments in Wales
Wales
Defunct football competitions in Wales
1984 disestablishments in Wales